Stanground is a residential area of Peterborough in the unparished area of Old Fletton, in the Peterborough district, in the ceremonial county of Cambridgeshire, England. For electoral purposes it comprises Stanground South and Fletton & Stanground wards in North West Cambridgeshire constituency.

Overview
Situated south of the River Nene, on relatively high ground overlooking The Fens, the area was historically part of the Isle of Ely in Cambridgeshire and of Huntingdonshire, rather than the Soke of Peterborough in Northamptonshire. By 1901 Stanground was the only civil parish in England contained partly in two administrative counties. In 1901 the parish had a population of 1461. On 1 April 1905 the part in the county of Huntingdon was designated a separate parish, Stanground South, within Old Fletton Urban District and the anomaly removed; the remainder, in Thorney Rural District, becoming Stanground North. In 1965 Huntingdonshire and the Soke amalgamated as Huntingdon and Peterborough and the Isle of Ely and historic Cambridgeshire (excluding Thorney Rural District which transferred to Huntingdon and Peterborough) amalgamated as Cambridgeshire and the Isle of Ely. In 1974 Thorney Rural District and Old Fletton Urban District became part of the current district in the new non-metropolitan county. As part of a rural district prior to the passing of the Act, Stanground North remained parished. This redundant parish which contained no dwellings or residents was finally abolished on 1 April 2004.

The ecclesiastical parish of Saint John the Baptist in the Diocese of Ely covers the whole area. However, it has now been placed under the pastoral care of the Bishop of Peterborough, acting as Assistant Bishop in the Diocese of Ely. Lampass Cross, a 12th-century scheduled monument, stands in the churchyard. The parish, along with its church, appears as Stoneground in the ghost stories of E. G. Swain, who was vicar there from 1905–1916. Situated adjacent to the fire station, Stanground cemetery, which opened in 1890, has limited grave availability for those residents who have family already buried there.

Stanground St. Johns Church of England (Voluntary Controlled) Primary School, Oakdale Primary School, Southfields Infant and Junior schools, Heritage Park Primary School and St. Michael's Church of England (Voluntary Aided) School are located in the area; secondary pupils attend Stanground Academy.

Cambridgeshire Fire and Rescue Service maintain a fire station, crewed day and night and equipped with Water Tender and Multistar (aerial platform), off Whittlesey Road.

History 

RESURRECTION-MEN. These criminals found their way to the neighbourhood of Peterborough, and one night succeeded in taking the body of a young man, recently buried, from the church-yard of Stanground. A man was taken into custody at Peterborough on suspicion: two others, supposed to be his companions escaped. A horse and cart belonging to the party, and left at Norman Cross, was detained by the Peterborough constables. Various instruments used in the horrid traffic where found in a ditch near the bridge.

Notable people
Raymond Smythies (1824–1861), cricketer

See also
Counties (Detached Parts) Act 1844
Stanground Newt Ponds
Stanground Wash

References

External links
Stanground College now Stanground Academy
Stanground St. Johns School
Oakdale School
Southfields School
Believe in Stanground!
Park Farm Neighbourhood News
Architecture in Peterborough
Vice Consulate of Italy in Bedford

Suburbs of Peterborough
Former civil parishes in Cambridgeshire